Found on Sodid Streets is the ninth album by saxophonist Gary Thomas recorded in 1996 and released on the Winter & Winter label.

Reception
AllMusic awarded the album 4 stars.

Track listing
All compositions by Gary Thomas except as indicated
 "Spellbound"  (George Colligan) - 10:04
 "Treason" - 6:42
 "The Eternal Present" (Terri Lyne Carrington) - 9:04
 "Exile's Gate" - 10:41
 "Hyper Space" (Colligan) - 9:07
 "Found on Sordid Streets" - 8:36
 "Peace of the Korridor" - 8:02

Personnel
Gary Thomas - tenor saxophone, rap
Paul Bollenback - guitar
George Colligan - organ 
Howard Curtis - drums
Steve Moss - percussion

References 

1997 albums
Gary Thomas (musician) albums
Winter & Winter Records albums